Sally Obermeder (born 17 August 1973) is an Australian media personality and television presenter.

Career

Swiish 
In November 2012, Obermeder launched swiish.com, a lifestyle blog. The website covers a variety of topics, such as fashion, beauty, health, home and family.  In 2015, swiish.com expanded into an online store, selling fashion, accessories and homewares.

Books 
Obermeder's first book,  Never Stop Believing, was released in April of 2013 through Allen & Unwin. In the memoir, Obermeder shares her struggles to succeed in the world of commercial television, as well as her battle with cancer.

Obermeder released and her sister released their first e-book, Super Green Smoothies, in September of 2014. The book covers green smoothie recipes to help with health and weight loss.  In April of 2013, a paperback version of the book was published by the Allen and Unwin publishing company.  The book is now in its 12th reprint and has sold over 120,000 copies, making it the bestselling smoothie book in Australia. Super Green Smoothies was also the third highest-selling non-fiction book of 2015.

In March 2016, Obermeder and Koraiem released The Good Life, a cookbook made up of their favorite meals to cook.

In September 2017, Obermeder and Koraiem released their third cookbook, Super Green, Simple and Lean, which featured more than 140 recipes of smoothies, salads, bowls, and snacks.

Smoothie challenges 
After success with their first book in 2015, Obermeder and her sister launched their first Super Green Smoothie 30 Day Smoothie Challenge.  The challenge required participants to drink one super green smoothie every day for 30 days, using the recipes provided in their cookbook.

Radio 
In 2017, Sally Koraiem joined the Macquarie Radio Network as the host of her own talkback show, Better Living with Sally Obermeder. The show provides news coverage and views on topics such as fashion, beauty, health and family.

Television career 
Obermeder's career with Seven Network began when she joined the Sydney Weekender team in 2005. Out on the road for the weekly travel and lifestyle show, Obermeder covered a mix of stories. In the same year Obermeder also presented the New Zealand special of Mike Whitney's Walkabout, a national travel series which aired in 2005 and 2006.

In 2008, Obermeder joined the network's former evening current affairs show Today Tonight as National Entertainment and Lifestyle Reporter, she remained in the position until 2013. In the position, she conducted over 200 celebrity interviews, her most notable include Beyonce, Angelina Jolie, Hugh Jackman, Mark Wahlberg, Jonah Hill, Eva Mendes, Justin Timberlake, Salma Hayek, Will Ferrell, Elle Macpherson and Jon Bon Jovi.

Previous to her commencement at Seven Network, Obermeder sourced, scripted, produced and presented her own segments on Channel 31's Not The Movie Show, a film and entertainment program.

In 2013, Obermeder was appointed co-host of the Seven Network's afternoon show The Daily Edition alongside Tom Williams, Monique Wright and Kris Smith. The show was a combination of breaking news, live interviews and entertainment updates. The live panel show aired on weekdays at 2pm before it was axed in June 2020. Obermeder left the Seven Network following its final episode on 26 June 2020.

Ambassadorships 
Obermeder is an ambassador for the National Breast Cancer Foundation,  The Sony Foundation. and also works with the Nelune Foundation and The Breast Cancer Network of Australia. In addition, Obermeder has recently launched her own charitable initiative, 'Wish bySwiish' where with her team at SWIISH they try to bring a little joy and happiness into the lives of breast and ovarian cancer sufferers, by turning their wishes into reality.

In October 2015 Obermeder was announced as the ambassador for Avon Cosmetics. She has also featured in campaigns for Westfield, Priceline, and The ATC Spring Racing Carnival.

Past careers 
Before her television career, Obermeder worked in finance and investment banking until 2003.

Obermeder is also a qualified personal trainer and pilates instructor.

Personal life
Sally Obermeder married Marcus Obermeder in 2001. After several years of trying to conceive a baby, the couple tried In vitro fertilisation (IVF) and conceived in January 2011. Their daughter was born in October 2011, the day after Sally Obermdeder was diagnosed with stage 3 breast cancer. In July 2016 Obermeder revealed that she was to have another child by a surrogate mother. In December 2016, she had her second child through a surrogate in the United States.

Cancer diagnosis
Once her daughter was born, Obermeder started eight months of chemotherapy. Obermeder said that the chemotherapy, alongside caring for her newborn baby, was exhausting, but strengthening of her life. Obermeder, her colleagues, and her friends in the television industry staged a fundraising event at The Beresford in February of 2012.

Obermeder attended the InStyle magazine 'Women of Style Awards' in May 2012. She received a standing ovation for her speech in which she discussed the meaning of style, and what she has learned through her battle with cancer while also being a new mum. Additionally, Obermeder wrote a book about her experience.

In June of 2012, Obermeder underwent her first mastectomy. From July to September 2012, she also received radiotherapy treatment. The second mastectomy and reconstruction surgery occurred in September 2012.

In October 2012 Obermeder underwent extensive testing and was given the all clear – exactly one year after the initial cancer diagnosis. She continues her publicity campaign for breast cancer awareness.

In 2016, Obermeder celebrated passing the five year all-clear mark.

References 

1973 births
People from Sydney
Living people
Australian television presenters
Australian women television presenters
Australian self-help writers